Libya (Libyan Arab Jamahiriya) sent a delegation of 7 athletes to compete at the 2008 Summer Olympics in Beijing, China. This was the last time as the Libyan Arab Jamahiriya that Libya went to the Olympics.

Athletics 

Men

Women

Cycling

Road

Judo

Swimming

Men

Women

Taekwondo 

Ezedin Tlish will represent Libya in Taekwondo. (Men's Under 68 kg)

References
 "Libyans at the Beijing 2008 Olympic Games", Tripoli Post, August 3, 2008

Nations at the 2008 Summer Olympics
2008
Olympics